Mulan: An Original Walt Disney Records Soundtrack is the soundtrack for the 1998 Disney animated feature film, Mulan. Released by Walt Disney Records on June 2, 1998, the album featured songs by Matthew Wilder and David Zippel, conducted by Paul Bogaev, and score composed and conducted by Jerry Goldsmith. Vocalists included Lea Salonga, Donny Osmond, 98 Degrees, Jaz Coleman, Stevie Wonder and Christina Aguilera.

The album peaked at No. 24 on the Billboard 200 on July 18, 1998, concurrent to the film's run in theaters. No singles from the album charted on the Hot 100, although Aguilera's version of "Reflection" did reach number 15 on the Adult Contemporary chart, while 98° and Stevie Wonder's "True to Your Heart", the film's theme song, did reach number 51 on the Adult Contemporary chart.

The album was nominated for an Academy Award for Best Original Musical or Comedy Score but lost to Shakespeare in Love.

A limited edition promotional album featuring Jerry Goldsmith's complete score was also released and became a collector's item.

Track listing 
All songs are composed by Matthew Wilder with lyrics by David Zippel. All scores are composed by Jerry Goldsmith.

‡ Harvey Fierstein, Matthew Wilder, Lea Salonga and Eddie Murphy each have one line in the chorus while Jerry Tondo has two.

Japanese version bonus track 
13. "Breathe (special version)" - Luna Sea

Chinese version bonus track 
13. "Reflection" (pop version) — Coco Lee

Korean version bonus track 
13. "Eternal Memory" - Lena Park (available in both English and Korean versions)

13. "Reflection" - Lena Park (Korean pop version)

Canadian French version 
 "Pour notre honneur à tous" (To everyone's honor) -— Martine Chevrier, Dominique Faure, Catherine Léveillé & chorus
 "Reflet" (Reflection) -- Martine Chevrier
 "Je ferai de vous des hommes avant tout!" (I will make men out of you first!) - Robert Marien, Michel Charette, André Montmorency, Alain Couture, Anthony Kavanagh, Martine Chevrier & chorus
 "La fille de nos rêves" (The girl of our dreams) - André Montmorency, Alain Couture, Michel Charette, Sébastien Dhavernas, Martine Chevrier & chorus
 "True to Your Heart" — 98°, Stevie Wonder
 "Suite pour Mulan" (Suite for Mulan) -- Instrumental
 "Attaque au pied de la muraille" (Attack at the foot of the Wall) -- Instrumental
 "La décision de Mulan" (Mulan's decision) -- Instrumental
 "La jeune fille en fleurs" (The young blossoming girl) -- Instrumental
 "Les Huns attaquent" (The Huns attack) -- Instrumental
 "Le village en cendres" (The village in ashes) -- Instrumental
 "Reflection (version pop)" - Christina Aguilera

Greek version 
 "True to Your Heart (single)" — 98°, Stevie Wonder
 "Reflection" Instrumental — Vanessa-Mae
 "Kamári ólon mas, esý (Honor to Us All)" (Καμάρι όλων μας, εσύ) [Pride of all of us, you] — Despina Vandi, Christina Koutsoudaki, Chorus
 "Poiá eímai? (Ποιά είμαι;) (Reflection)" [Who am I;] — Despina Vandi
 "Leventiá! (Λεβεντιά!) (I'll Make a Man Out of You)" [Manliness!] — Despina Vandi, Petros Filipidis, Alex Panayi, Kostas Vretos, Kostas Bakalis, Pimis Petrou, Chorus
 "Aftí pou s' agapá... (Αυτή που σ' αγαπά...) (A Girl Worth Fighting For)" [She who loves ...] — Despina Vandi, Pimis Petrou, Kostas Vretos, Kostas Bakalis, Giannis Papaioannou
 "Konta Mallia (Κοντά μαλλιά) (Short Hair)" Instrumental
 "To Thema Tis Mulan (Το θέμα της Μουλάν) (Suite from Mulan)" Instrumental
 "Epithesi Sto Tihos (Επίθεση στο τείχος) (Attack at the Wall)" Score
 "I Apofasi Tis Mulan (Η απόφαση της Μουλάν) (Mulan's Decision)" Score
 "Ta Anthi (Τα άνθη) (Blossoms)" Score
 "I Epithesi Ton Ounon (Η επίθεση των Ούνων) (The Huns Attack)" Score
 "To Kameno Horio (Το καμένο χωριό) (The Burned-Out Village)" Score
 "Reflection (pop version)" — Christina Aguilera

Polish version 
 "Lustro / Mirror" (Reflection; pop version) — Edyta Górniak
 "Zaszczyt nam przyniesie to / The honor will bring us to" (Honor to Us All) — Mirosława Krajewska, Teresa Lipowska, Katarzyna Pysiak, Chorus
 "Lustro / Mirror" (Reflection) — Katarzyna Pysiak
 "Zrobię z was mężczyzn / I will make of you men" (I'll Make a Man Out of You) — Maciej Molęda, Robert Rozmus, Jerzy Stuhr, Katarzyna Pysiak, Jerzy Bończak, Marek Bocianiak, Chorus
 "Ta, za którą walczyć chcesz / This, for which you want to fight" (A Girl Worth Fighting For) — Robert Rozmus, Jerzy Bończak, Marek Bocianiak, Katarzyna Pysiak, Paweł Galia
 "Postrzyżyny" (Short Hair) — Instrumental
 "Suita z Mulan" (Suite from Mulan) — Instrumental
 "Atak" (Attack at the Wall) — Score
 "Decyzja" (Mulan's Decision) — Score
 "Pąki" (Blossoms) — Score
 "Natarcie Hunów" (The Huns Attack) — Score
 "Spalona wioska" (The Burned-Out Village) — Score
 "Reflection" Instrumental — Vanessa-Mae
 "True to Your Heart (Single)" — 98°, Stevie Wonder

Latin American Spanish version 
 "Nos vas a Brindar Honor / You're going to Provide us Honor"
 "Reflejo / Reflection" — Analy
 "Hombres de Acción Serán Hoy / Men of Action You'll Be Today" Cristian Castro, Jesús Barrero, Miguel Ángel Ghigliazza, Raúl Carballeda, Eugenio Derbez, Analy
 "Mi Chica es la Razón / My Girl is the Reason" Raúl Carballeda, Analy, Mario Filio, Miguel Ángel Ghigliazza, Jesús Barrero
 "Tu corazón / Your heart" — Cristian Castro
 "Suite de Mulán"
 "Ataque en la Muralla"
 "La decisión de Mulán"
 "Capullos"
 "Atacan los hunos"
 "La aldea quemada"
 "Reflejo" (versión pop) — Lucero
 "Reflejo" — Christina Aguilera (Special Edition)

Arabic version
 ترفع رأسنا بين الناس / Turfae rasuna bayn alnnas / Lift our heads among the people (Honor to Us All)
 مولان في المعركة / Mulan fi almaeraka / Mulan in battle (Mulan's fight)
 صورتي / Surati / My image (Reflection)
 منكم هعمل رجال مهما يكون / Minkum haemal rijal mahma yakun / Whatever you men have (I'll Make a Man Out of You)
 قرار مولان / Qarar mawlan (Mulan's Decision)

Brazilian version
 'Honra a Todas Nós / Honor All Of Us' (Honor to Us All) — Kacau Gomes, Nádia Carvalho & Selma Lopes
 'Imagem / Image' (Reflection) — Kacau Gomes
 'Não Vou Desistir de Nenhum / I Will not Give up on You' (I'll Make a Man Out of You) — Cláudio Galvan
 'Alguém pra Quem Voltar / Someone Who to Come Back'  (A Girl Worth Fighting For) - Isaac Bardavid, Marco Rodrigo & Deco Fiori
 'Seu Coração / Your heart'  (True to Your Heart) — Sandy & Junior · Portuguese lyrics by Pavlos | Produced by Renato Lopez
 'Tema de Mulan [Instrumental]' (Suite from Mulan)
 'Ataque na Muralha [Instrumental]' (Attack at the Wall)
 'A Decisão de Mulan [Instrumental]' (Mulan's Decision)
 'Botões em Flor [Instrumental]' (Blossoms)
 'O Ataque Hunos [Instrumental]' (The Huns Attack)
 'A Aldeia Queimada [Instrumental]' (The Burned-Out Village)
 'Imagem (pop version)'  (Reflection - pop version) — Sandy · Portuguese lyrics by Marcelo Coutinho | Produced by Renato Lopez

Mandarin Chinese version
 以妳為榮 (Yi Ni Wei Rong)
 真情的自我 (Zhen Qing de Zi Wo)
 男子漢 (Nan Zi Han)
 佳人歡迎我 (Jia Ren Huan Ying Wo)
 依隨你心 (Yi Sui Ni Xin)
 木蘭組曲 (Mu Lan Zu Qü)
 攻上城牆 (Gong Shang Cheng Qiang)
 木蘭的決定 (Mu Lan de Jüe Ding)
 遲來的花開 (Chi Lai de Hua Kai)
 匈奴進攻 (Xiong Nu Jin Gong)
 村破垣殘 (Cun Po Yuan Can)
 自己 (Zi Ji) - Coco Lee

Italian version
 "Molto onore ci darai / Much honor you give us" – Cristina Dori, Melina Cartello, Marianna Cataldi
 "Riflesso / Reflection" – Marianna Cataldi
 "Farò di te un uomo / I'll make a man out of you" – Silver Pozzoli, Enrico Papi, Vittorio Matteucci, Gigi Giannola, Veris Giannetti, Marianna Cataldi
 "Per lei mi batterò / I'll fight for her" – Vittorio Matteucci, Veris Giannetti, Gigi Giannola, Laura Lenghi, Michele Centonze
 "Taglio di capelli / Haircut"
 "Suite per Mulan / Suite for Mulan"
 "Attacco alla muraglia / Assault on wall"
 "La decisione di Mulan / Mulan's decision"
 "Germogli in fiore / Buds in bloom"
 "L'attacco degli unni / The Huns attack"
 "Il villaggio in fiamme / The burning village"
 "Riflesso (pop version)" — Syria

European Spanish version
 Reflejo (dance version) — Malú
 True to Your Heart (single) — 98º, Stevie Wonder
 Reflection — Vanessa-Mae
 Honra nos darás (Honor You Will Give Us) — Paula Bas, Celia Vergara, Marta Martorell, María Caneda
 Reflejo — María Caneda
 Voy a hacer todo un hombre de ti (I'm Going to Make a Man of You)— Pablo Perea, Juan Manuel Escamilla, Miguel Morant, Adel Hakki, María Caneda, José Sánchez Mota
 Mi dulce y linda flor (My Sweet and Cute Flower)— Juan Manuel Escamilla, Miguel Morant, Adel Hakki, Eva Díez, Gonzalo Durán
 Corte de pelo (Haircut)
 Suite de Mulán (Suite from Mulan)
 Ataque a la muralla (Attack at the Wall)
 La decisión de Mulán (Mulan's Decision)
 Flores (Flowers)
 Los hunos atacan (The Huns Attack)
 El pueblo en llamas (The Village on Fire)
 Reflejo (pop version) — Malú

European French version
 Honneur à tous — Marie-Thérèse Orain 
 Réflexion — Marie Galey 
 Comme un Homme — Jose Garcia, Michel Vigné, Patrick Fiori, Pierre Francois Pistorio, Thierry Ragueneau 
 Une belle fille à aimer — Marie Galey, Michel Vigné, Pierre Francois Pistorio, Thierry Ragueneau 
 Transformation
 En quête de Mulan Jerry Goldsmith 
 La faille de la muraille
 La décision de Mulan
 L'éclosion
 L'attaque des huns
 Le village dévasté
 Qui je suis vraiment — Melanie Cohl 
 Reflection — Vanessa-Mae 
 True to Your Heart — 98°, Stevie Wonder

Charts 
Album

Singles

Album certifications

Unreleased songs

"Keep 'Em Guessing"
A deleted song aptly called "Keep 'Em Guessing", which was removed from the film when Eddie Murphy was cast as Mushu. This song was revealed on the Mulan 2-Disc Special Edition but Disney chose not to re-release the soundtrack to Mulan, despite doing so for the soundtracks to Beauty and the Beast, The Lion King, and Aladdin. It was brought back for the stage musical Mulan Jr.

"Written in Stone"
This song was originally placed in the section where Mulan questions her identity, and decides to write her own destiny rather than succumbing to societal gender roles. It was eventually replaced by Reflection. Despite originally being a 4-minute power ballad, in the stage musical Mulan Jr., it is broken up into small pieces, and reprised many times throughout the musical. It is sung by the ancestors in the intro as they explain the family structure of China much like Tradition in Fiddler on the Roof. A later reprise by Mulan demonstrates that she wants her life to be written in stone....but by herself, not by her ancestors.

References 

1998 soundtrack albums
1990s film soundtrack albums
Soundtrack
Disney Renaissance soundtracks
Albums produced by Matthew Wilder
Disney animation soundtracks
Walt Disney Records soundtracks